Brish may refer to:
Alexei Brish (born 1986), Russian Hockey player
Arkady Brish (1917–2016), Soviet physicist 
William M. Brish (1906–1999), American public administrator
Brish Run, a tributary of Pine Creek in Pennsylvania, United States

See also 
 Briche (disambiguation)